Albara hollowayi is a moth in the family Drepanidae. It was described by Watson in 1970. It is found in Taiwan and on Sumatra, Peninsular Malaysia and Borneo. The habitat consists of lowland forests, extending weakly into montane forests.

References

Moths described in 1970
Drepaninae
Moths of Asia